American Committee for Peace in Chechnya is a private, non-governmental organization (NGO) in North America. It was founded in 1999 who exclusive stated aim was to promote a peaceful resolution to the separatist insurgency in Chechnya (Second Chechen war). Chaired by former National Security Advisor Zbigniew Brzezinski, former Secretary of State Alexander M. Haig and former Congressman Stephen J. Solarz, the committee is composed of more than one hundred distinguished Americans representing both major political parties and nearly every walk of life.
Based at Freedom House, the Committee's mission encompasses three distinct yet interrelated objectives:

Advocacy: Developing and promoting policies, through the U.S. government and international institutions, aimed at protecting civilians, improving conditions for refugees and securing a cease-fire;
Information: Advancing public awareness of the Chechen separatists cause, including its broader implications for democracy, human rights, and regional stability in both Russia and the former Soviet Union; and
Diplomacy: Convening private "Track II" talks between representatives of the Russian government and Chechen separatists militants, aimed at developing a framework for ending the war and resolving Chechnya's long-term legal and political status.

To those ends, ACPC organizes educational programs for the public, develops policy recommendations for lawmakers and collaborates with an international network of more than 400 activists, journalists, scholars and non-governmental organizations. The Committee distributes Chechnya Today, a daily email news service, and Chechnya Weekly, an online news magazine produced by the Jamestown Foundation and edited until 2004 by Lawrence A. Uzzell.

Related organizations 
 Jamestown Foundation
 Radio Free Europe/Radio Liberty
 Freedom House

ACPC members

References

External links
 Official website of this organization
 

Human rights organizations based in the United States
Human rights in Chechnya
Non-profit organizations based in Washington, D.C.
Political and economic think tanks in the United States
Second Chechen War
Indigenous rights organizations